Sir Ralf Dieter Speth  (born 9 September 1955) is a German/British automotive executive and a director of Indian company Tata Sons since 2016. From 2010 to 2020, he was the chief executive officer of Jaguar Land Rover. He has also had roles with BMW, Linde and Ford's Premier Automotive Group. Speth is the chairman of TVS Motor Company.

Education
Speth earned a degree in engineering from the University of Applied Sciences Rosenheim, Germany. He later undertook a doctorate of engineering in mechanical engineering and business administration at the University of Warwick.

Career
Speth started his automotive career with BMW in 1980 and worked for them for 20 years.

In 2002, he joined The Linde Group and served as head of global operations and as vice president of operations. He was also chief operating officer and a member of the executive board at its subsidiary KION Group GmbH.

In 2007, Speth returned to the car industry and joined Ford Motor Company's Premier Automotive Group (PAG) as director of production, quality and product planning. Following the sale of two of the PAG marques, Jaguar and Land Rover, to Tata, he became chief executive officer of Jaguar Land Rover (JLR) in February 2010, and a non-executive director of Tata Motors in November 2010.

Under Speth's management, JLR increased the company's workforce significantly. "We have added more than 17,000 people
in the course of the last five years," he said in an interview published in June 2015. Speth championed the need for R&D and made much of JLR's investment in R&D. "I guess we are the biggest R&D investor in the UK in the automotive business," he claimed.

In the 2015 Special Honours list, Speth was appointed an honorary Knight Commander of the Order of the British Empire for his services to the automotive industry. In August 2019, the award was made substantive following Speth becoming a British citizen.

In September 2016, Speth was appointed an honorary professor, having previously been an industrial professor.

In October 2016, Speth was appointed an additional director on the board of Tata Sons. On 30 January 2020 he announced his intention to retire from his role as CEO of JLR effective September 2020, but remain on both the JLR and Tata Sons boards. He entered into a non-executive role in the company and was succeeded by the CEO of Renault, Thierry Bolloré.

In 2020 he was elected a Fellow of the Royal Society.

In April 2022, Speth took over the role of chairman of Indian automaker TVS Motor Company succeeding Venu Srinivasan.

Personal life
He is married, with two children, and lives between Leamington Spa and Munich.

References

1955 births
Living people
People from Roth (district)
German automotive engineers
German chief executives
Chief executives in the automobile industry
Chief operating officers
Jaguar Land Rover
Knights Commander of the Order of the British Empire
Alumni of the University of Warwick
Alumni of Warwick Business School
Engineers from Bavaria
Fellows of the Royal Society
Tata Motors people
Naturalised citizens of the United Kingdom
British automotive engineers
British chief executives